The Buzăiel (also: Buzoel, Buzăul Mic) is a right tributary of the river Buzău in Romania that discharges into the Buzău near Vama Buzăului.

References

Rivers of Romania
Rivers of Brașov County